Metaleptea brevicornis, the clipped-wing grasshopper, is a species of grasshopper from North America.

Distribution

M. brevicornis is found in wetlands across a large part of eastern North America, from the Great Lakes region south to Florida and Mexico.

Taxonomy
Carl Linnaeus described Metaleptea brevicornis in his 1763 work Centuria Insectorum under the name Gryllus brevicornis. The genus Metaleptea was erected in 1893 by Carl Brunner von Wattenwyl to hold the "American species of the genus Truxalis Fabricius", including M. brevicornis. In 1897, Ermanno Giglio-Tos designated M. brevicornis as the type species of the genus Metaleptea, and included a second species, "Metaleptea minor", now treated as a subspecies of Eutryxalis filata. For some time, the genus contained only M. brevicornis, with two subspecies – M. b. brevicornis and M. b. adspersa – but the latter is now treated as a separate species, Metaleptea adspersa.

References

Acrididae
Orthoptera of North America
Insects described in 1763
Taxa named by Carl Linnaeus